Bradina eremica is a moth in the family Crambidae. It was described by John Frederick Gates Clarke in 1986. It is found on the Marquesas Islands in French Polynesia.

References

Moths described in 1986
Bradina
Fauna of the Marquesas Islands